The Oak Grove Cemetery is a historic cemetery on Parker Street in New Bedford, Massachusetts.  It consists of two parcels, separated by Parker Street, northwest of the city's central business district.  The older portion of the cemetery, that south of Parker Street, was established in 1843, while the northern section was acquired and developed between 1870 and 1896.  Most of the cemetery is laid out in the then-fashionable rural cemetery style of winding lanes, although the northernmost section has a more open layout, made partly due to complaints about the cluttered nature of the rural cemetery style.

The cemetery was listed on the National Register of Historic Places in 2014.

Notable burials
 William P. Brownell (1839–1915) Civil War Medal of Honor Recipient
 Richard Albert Canfield (1855–1914) businessman and gambler
 SGT William Harvey Carney (1840–1908) Civil War Medal of Honor recipient
 John Duffey (1836–1923) Civil War Medal of Honor
 Thomas D. Eliot (1808–1870) Civil War US Congressman
 Harry Stovey (1856–1937) Professional Baseball Player

See also
 National Register of Historic Places listings in New Bedford, Massachusetts

References

External links
 

Cemeteries on the National Register of Historic Places in Massachusetts
Cemeteries in Bristol County, Massachusetts
Buildings and structures in New Bedford, Massachusetts
National Register of Historic Places in New Bedford, Massachusetts
Rural cemeteries
Cemeteries established in the 1840s
1843 establishments in Massachusetts